Stefan Stratimirović (27 December 1757 – 22 September 1836) was a Serbian bishop who served as the Metropolitan of Karlovci, head of the Serbian Orthodox Church in the Austrian Empire, between 1790 and 1836. Having been appointed metropolitan at the age of 33, Stratimirović maintained control over church life decisively and autonomously. He was an aid to Serbian rebel leader Karađorđe  during the First Serbian Uprising and actively participated in the suppression of Tican's Rebellion in 1807. Furthermore, he published Jovan Rajić's seminal work at a most propitious occasion.

Early life and appointment
 
Born in Kulpin, a town in the Military Frontier, Stratimirović's family hailed from Herzegovina. Stratimirović lived in a private estate awarded to his family by Marie Therese in 1745. He graduated from grade schools in Kulpin and Begeč and later attained the Gymnasium in Novi Sad, from which he also graduated. Stratimirović subsequently studied philosophy and law in Vienna and Buda, later moving on to theology which he studied privately in Sremski Karlovci under Serbian archimandrite Jovan Rajić, because there were not yet any Serbian theology schools at the time. In 1784 he joined the Serbian Orthodox Church as a monk, and in 1786 he was appointed Bishop of Vršac. Sometime later, he was appointed in the Eparchy of Buda, where he served for four years, from 1786 to 1790. On October 29, 1790, Stratimirović was made Metropolitan of Karlovci at the Assembly of Timișoara, at the age of 33.

Metropolitan of Karlovci
 
As metropolitan, Stratimirović paid special attention to the building of educational institutions. With the help of merchant Dimitrije Anastasijević Sabov he founded the Gymnasium of Karlovci in 1792, in 1794 the Karlovci Theology School, and in 1795 the Blagodejanije fund (later called "Stefaneum").

He edited and expanded the Metropolitanate library and established higher discipline within the clergy. As a religious leader, he inspired independence and supported the First Serbian Uprising, despite leading the clergy remotely from within the Austrian Empire. He led a struggle against Viennese attempts of unifying Serbs with the Austrian Empire. He was a devoted enthusiast of both science and literature.

Under the strong influence of the conflict for preserving orthodoxy, Stratimirović gradually became more and more conservative and in so doing was opposed to the language reformations of Dositej Obradović, Sava Mrkalj, and Vuk Stefanović Karadžić. During the First Serbian Uprising he helped the rebels in secret by assisting in the supply of munitions and gunpowder from Prussia. In June 1804, he informed the Russian court of the plan of reviving the Serbian Empire as a protectorate of Russia. In 1807 he played an active role in silencing Tican's Rebellion in Srem.

His heritage included many written works in a variety of languages as well as subjects. Although only two of his major works were ever printed during his lifetime, he wrote many other works in Latin, German and Serbian, among which there are historical, clerical, literary and other texts. After his death in 1836, more of his works were printed in published. Although requested, a biography was never written on his behalf, and only a list of his works and an outline on his life were ever written and published for the general public.

Stratimirović was decorated Order of Leopold of the first class.

Legacy
He is included in The 100 most prominent Serbs.

Annotations

See also
 Metropolitanate of Karlovci
 List of heads of the Serbian Orthodox Church

References

Further reading
Народна енциклопедија Срба, Хрвата и Словенаца, Ст. Станојевић, Загреб, 1925–1929.

External links

Родољубиви архијереј („Глас јавности“, 28. октобар 2000.) (Serbian)

Metropolitans of Karlovci
1757 births
1836 deaths
Habsburg Serbs
18th-century Serbian people
19th-century Serbian people